Konoe Nagako (近衛長子; 1218 – March 9, 1275) also known as Takatsukasa-in (鷹司院), was Empress of Japan as the consort of Emperor Go-Horikawa.

Notes

Fujiwara clan
Japanese empresses
1218 births
1275 deaths